Dieter Annies (born 1 December 1942) is a German politician of the Free Democratic Party (FDP) and former member of the German Bundestag.

Life 
For the elections to the Volkskammer on 18 March 1990, he was placed third on the list of the electoral alliance Die Liberalen in his electoral district and moved into the Volkskammer as a member of parliament. On 28 September 1990, Annies was elected to the Bundestag by the Volkskammer of the GDR, where he remained as a member of parliament for the Free Democratic Party (FDP) until 20 December.

Literature

References 

1942 births
Members of the Bundestag for Saxony
Members of the Bundestag 1987–1990
Members of the Bundestag for the Free Democratic Party (Germany)
Members of the 10th Volkskammer
Living people